A destructive tornado outbreak impacted the Midwestern United States and Tennessee River Valley on November 15, 2005. It occurred along a cold front separating warm, humid air from the southeast from cold Arctic air to the north and northwest. 49 tornadoes were confirmed in the central United States in the states of Alabama, Arkansas, Illinois, Indiana, Kentucky, Missouri and Tennessee over that afternoon and evening. Strong winds and large hail caused additional damage throughout the region.

The strongest tornado was an F4 tornado on the Fujita scale; it occurred in the vicinity of Earlington and Madisonville, Kentucky. It was also the only violent tornado documented in 2005.

Meteorological synopsis
The Storm Prediction Center of the National Weather Service in Norman, Oklahoma had issued a "high risk" for severe weather over an area from northern Mississippi to central Indiana. Such a declaration is unusual (particularly for November) and means that there is a significant threat for severe thunderstorms with widespread tornadic activity. When the first tornado watches of the afternoon were issued, the SPC had declared a Particularly Dangerous Situation (PDS) for destructive tornadoes in several of the tornado watches, a highly unusual alert which notifies that frequent and dangerous tornadoes are possible, and by late that evening, no less than 49 tornadoes (including ten strong tornadoes and one violent tornado) were confirmed, and several more unconfirmed tornadoes were reported (and later confirmed as microbursts). Fortunately, the tornadoes were centered over more rural areas and damage was scattered but severe over many communities. There were numerous injuries, but remarkably, only one person was killed. The low casualty toll was likely due to the fact the outbreak was well-predicted and primarily occurred in the afternoon when people are most aware of the situation.

This was the third major tornado outbreak of November 2005, the other two being in Evansville, Indiana on November 6 (killing 25 people) and in much of Iowa on November 12 (killing one person). There was another major outbreak in the same general area on November 27 and 28, killing two people.

Confirmed tornadoes

See also
List of North American tornadoes and tornado outbreaks
Tornadoes of 2005

References

External links
Storm Reports for Nov. 15 (NWS Storm Prediction Center)
Nashville weather site with photos of damage in Middle Tennessee
National Weather Service-Paducah, KY Report
National Weather Service-Central Illinois Report
Marion County, IL Tornado (NWS St. Louis)
National Weather Service-Memphis, TN Report
Montgomery/Dickson County Storm Damage (NWS Nashville, Tennessee)
Wayne County Storm Damage (NWS Nashville, Tennessee)
Benton/Humphreys/Houston County Storm Damage (NWS Nashville, Tennessee)
National Weather Service-Northern Indiana Report

F4 tornadoes by date
Tornadoes of 2005
Tornadoes in Kentucky
Tornadoes in Illinois
Tornadoes in Indiana
Tornadoes in Missouri
Tornadoes in Tennessee
2005 natural disasters in the United States
Tornado outbreak